Wiltshire County Cricket Club was established in January 1893. It has played minor counties cricket from 1895 and played List A cricket from 1964 to 2005, using a varying number of home grounds during that time. Their first home minor counties fixture in 1895 was against Bedfordshire at the County Ground, Trowbridge, while their first home List A match came 69 years later against Hampshire in the 1964 Gillette Cup at Hardenhuish Park, Chippenham.

The thirteen grounds that Wiltshire have used for home matches since 1895 are listed below, with statistics complete through to the end of the 2014 season.

Grounds

List A
Below is a complete list of grounds used by Wiltshire County Cricket Club when it was permitted to play List A matches. These grounds have also held Minor Counties Championship and MCCA Knockout Trophy matches.

Minor Counties
Below is a complete list of grounds used by Wiltshire County Cricket Club in Minor Counties Championship and MCCA Knockout Trophy matches.

Notes

References

Grounds
 
Wiltshire
Cricket grounds